David Ira Jablonski (born 1953) is an American professor of geophysical sciences at the University of Chicago. His research focuses upon the ecology and biogeography of the origin of major novelties, the evolutionary role of mass extinctions—in particular the Cretaceous–Paleogene extinction event—and other large-scale processes in the history of life.

Jablonksi is a proponent of the extended evolutionary synthesis.

Education
Jablonski was educated at Columbia University (earning his Bachelor of Arts degree in 1974) and completed his graduate work at Yale University (with his Master of Science degree in 1976 and Ph.D. in 1979). As an undergraduate he worked at the American Museum of Natural History in the City of New York, NY. Then continued postdoctoral research at the University of California, Santa Barbara and the University of California, Berkeley. In 1985 he was hired by the University of Chicago.

Awards
In 1988 the Paleontological Society awarded Jablonski with the Charles Schuchert Award, which is given to persons under 40 "whose work reflects excellence and promise in paleontology".  In 2010 he was elected to the National Academy of Sciences.
In 2017 the Paleontological Society awarded him their most prestigious prize, the Paleontological Society Medal

References

1953 births
Living people
University of Chicago faculty
Yale University alumni
American paleontologists
Extended evolutionary synthesis
Members of the United States National Academy of Sciences
Columbia College (New York) alumni
Paleobiologists